The 2022 Alabama lieutenant gubernatorial election was held on November 8, 2022, to elect the lieutenant governor of the state of Alabama. The election coincided with various other federal and state elections, including for Governor of Alabama. Primary elections were held on May 24, with runoffs scheduled for June 21 if a candidate failed to receive a majority of the vote.

Incumbent Republican lieutenant governor Will Ainsworth won re-election to a second term against Libertarian Ruth Page Nelson. He was first elected in 2018 to succeed Kay Ivey, who ascended to the governorship and left the office vacant in 2017. No Democratic candidates filed to run.

Republican primary

Candidates

Nominee 
 Will Ainsworth, incumbent lieutenant governor

Endorsements

Libertarian convention

Candidates

Nominee 
 Ruth Page-Nelson, community activist and Republican candidate for U.S. Senate in 2020

General election

Endorsements

Results

See also 
2022 Alabama elections
2022 Alabama gubernatorial election

References

External links 
Official campaign websites
 Will Ainsworth (R) for Lt. Governor
 Ruth Page-Nelson (L) for Lt. Governor

Lieutenant Governor
Alabama
Alabama lieutenant gubernatorial elections